Shahinur Pasha Chowdhury (born 1985) is a Bangladeshi politician and a former Jatiya Sangsad member representing the Sunamganj-3 constituency during 2005–2006. He was elected a member of parliament for the first time in July 2005 after the death of incumbent Abdus Samad Azad, a Awami League Presidium member.

Early life and education
Chowdhury was born in 1985 to a Bengali Muslim family in Patli Union, Jagannathpur, Sunamganj District, Bangladesh. He completed a Masters from Hadith studies at the Jamia Qasimul Uloom Madrasa, and then completed a degree at the Murari Chand College. After that, he studied law at the University of Dhaka.

Career 
In 1991, Chowdhury was affiliated with Chhatra Jamiat Bangladesh. He was the Central General Secretary. He is the Joint General Secretary of the Jamiat Ulema-e-Islam Bangladesh. Member of the Parliament elected from Sunamganj-3 constituency. He was elected a member of parliament for the first time after the death of former Foreign Minister Abdus Samad Azad, a member of the Awami League Presidium in the 2005.

Chowdhury unsuccessfully contested the 2008 and 2018 elections as a candidate of the four party alliance led by Bangladesh Nationalist Party and Jatiya Oikya Front.

Chowdhury served as the legal affairs secretary of Hefazat-e-Islam Bangladesh in 2019–2020. He is the vice-president of Jamiat Ulema-e-Islam Bangladesh. On 7 May 2021, he was detained by Criminal Investigation Department from Sylhet following riots by Hefazat during a state visit of Prime Minister Narendra Modi.

References

Living people
People from Patli Union
Bangladeshi politicians
University of Dhaka alumni
Deobandis
8th Jatiya Sangsad members
Islami Oikya Jote politicians
Jamiat Ulema-e-Islam Bangladesh politicians
1985 births
Bengali Muslim scholars of Islam
Bangladeshi Sunni Muslim scholars of Islam
Murari Chand College alumni